How We Roll  is an American sitcom that premiered on March 31, 2022 and ended on May 19, 2022 on CBS. The series is inspired by the life of professional bowler Tom Smallwood. In May 2022, the series was canceled after one season.

Premise
A 35-year old Midwestern husband and father gets laid off from his auto plant job, and makes the bold decision to provide for his family by following his dream of becoming a professional bowler.

Cast and characters

Main

 Pete Holmes as Tom Smallwood, a laid-off auto worker turned professional bowler
 Chi McBride as Archie Betts, proprietor of Archie's Lanes and Tom's long-time friend/mentor
 Katie Lowes as Jen Smallwood, Tom's wife who works as a hair stylist
 Julie White as Helen Smallwood, Tom's mother, and Jen's mother-in-law
 Mason Wells as Sam Smallwood, Tom and Jen's son

Recurring
 Tahj Mowry as Lew, an employee at Archie's Lanes
 Rondi Reed as Ruth, a hair salon owner and Jen's boss
 Judy Kain as Mimi
 Amanda Perez as Tia, Jen's co-worker
 Matt McCarthy as Carl, a regular customer at Archie's Lanes

Notable guests
 French Stewart as Jacob Powell

Episodes

Production

Development
On March 1, 2021, a sitcom titled The Tom Smallwood Project was given a pilot order with Mark Gross writing the pilot. In May 2021, the sitcom titled Smallwood was given a series order with Mark Cendrowski directing the pilot, and was scheduled for a mid-season premiere in the 2021–22 television season. On November 24, 2021, it was announced that the series title had been changed to How We Roll with an 11-episode count. On May 12, 2022, CBS canceled the series after one season.

Casting
On March 29, 2021, Pete Holmes was cast as the lead role for the pilot. In April 2021, Chi McBride and Katie Lowes were cast in main roles for the pilot. On November 1, 2021, Julie White was cast in a main role for the pilot. On December 10, 2021, Mason Wells was cast in a main role. On December 17, 2021, Tahj Mowry, Rondi Reed, Judy Kain, Amanda Perez and Matt McCarthy were cast in recurring roles.

Release
The series premiered on March 31, 2022 and ended on May 19, 2022.

Reception

Critical response
On review aggregator website Rotten Tomatoes, the series holds a 67% approval rating based on 6 critic reviews, with an average rating of 6.8/10. On Metacritic, the series has a score of 57 out of 100, based on 5 critics, indicating "mixed or average reviews".

Ratings

References

External links
 

2020s American sitcoms
2022 American television series debuts
2022 American television series endings
CBS original programming
English-language television shows
Television series by CBS Studios
American sports television series
Ten-pin bowling on television
Television series based on actual events
Television shows set in Michigan